Square Toiletries Ltd. is one of the largest fast-moving consumer goods (FMCG) companies in Bangladesh and is a subsidiary of Square Group. The company is marketing 20 brands in different segments like health and hygiene, oral care, hair care, fabric care etc. and producing more than 50 products. Major brands of the company are Jui, Chaka, Senora, Supermom, Magic, Sepnil, Kool, Meril Protective Care & Meril Baby. Square is also exporting its finished products to 13 countries- UAE, Germany, UK, Australia, Malaysia etc.

History 
Square Toiletries Limited was founded in 1988 as a division of Square Group and was made into a separate private limited company in 1994.

Specialties 
Manufacturer of different cosmetic and toiletries product categories, cosmetic contract manufacturing and packaging, marketer of different cosmetic and toiletries product categories

Major brands 
 Jui
 Meril
 Meril Baby
 Supermom
 Revive
 Chaka
 Chamak
 Senora
 Femina
 White Plus
 Magic
 Kool
 Xpel
 Spring
 Sepnil
 Zerocal
 Select Plus
 Shakti
 Rain Shower
 Maxclean

References

Further reading

External links
 

Manufacturing companies based in Dhaka
Personal care companies
Manufacturing companies established in 1994
Bangladeshi brands